The 360 Residential Condominiums skyscraper is located in Downtown Austin, Texas at 360 Nueces Street. The building topped out in November 2007, and construction was officially completed on May 22, 2008. 360 Condominiums was the tallest building in Austin from January 15, 2008 to June 29, 2009 when The Austonian surpassed it. The tower also became the tallest residential tower in Texas, surpassing The Merc in Dallas before the Austonian also took that title. Currently, it is the fourth tallest building in Austin after The Independent, The Austonian, and the Fairmont Austin.

The Austin 360 Condominiums Tower was developed by Billy Holley and Judd Bobilin of Novare Group and Andrews Urban LLC, designed by Preston Partnership LLC, sales managed by Kevin McDaniel and built by JE Dunn Construction. It features a pronounced setback at the sixteenth story, to avoid obstructing a Capitol View Corridor.

History
The building was first proposed by the Atlanta, Georgia-based Novare Group and Austin based Andrews Urban LLC in 2006 as a  40 storied tower.  However, as an attempt to increase units, more floors were added. Construction began on June 20, 2006 after the plan was approved. Floors were added at a fairly steady pace from the first to sixteenth floors, when the terrace level was reached on April 20, 2007, nearly a year after construction started. Activity slowed, but then quickened after the setback floor was finished. Spire assembly started on November 14 and was affixed in position 6 days later. This made the tower officially taller than its predecessor, the Frost Bank Tower. The building was finally complete in 2008. After nearly 2 years of construction, 360 Condominiums opened on May 23, 2008.

Amenities
Amenities include a swimming pool, a sundeck, theater, and clubroom.

Gallery

See also

List of tallest buildings in Austin
List of tallest buildings in Texas

References

External links

360 Official website
360 AustinTowers.net Profile
360 Emporis Profile

Residential skyscrapers in Austin, Texas
Residential condominiums in the United States
Residential buildings completed in 2008
Retail buildings in Texas
2008 establishments in Texas